Luigi Rizzi may refer to:

 Luigi Rizzi (footballer) (1907–?), Italian footballer with Inter Milan in the 1930s
 Luigi Rizzi (linguist) (born 1952), Italian linguist